The second season of High School Musical: The Musical: The Series, an American mockumentary musical drama streaming television series created by Tim Federle, premiered on Disney+ on May 14, 2021; the season consisted of 12 episodes, which released weekly until July 30, 2021. The series itself is inspired by the High School Musical film series.

In this season, the East High drama club returns after the success of High School Musical and puts on a production of Beauty and the Beast, and find themselves in the middle of a rivalry between Miss Jenn and her high school rival Zack, who is the drama club director of North High, that sees them entered into a prestigious high school theater competition.

Filming for the second season began in February 2020 but was shut down a month later due to the COVID-19 pandemic, with production resuming later that year and ending in early 2021. Joe Serafini, who recurred in the first season, was promoted to series regular, while this would be the final season with Olivia Rodrigo as a series regular. Disney+ renewed the series for a third season in September 2021.

Episodes

Cast and characters

Main 
 Olivia Rodrigo as Nini Salazar-Roberts
 Joshua Bassett as Ricky Bowen
 Matt Cornett as E.J. Caswell
 Sofia Wylie as Gina Porter
 Larry Saperstein as Big Red
 Julia Lester as Ashlyn Caswell
 Dara Reneé as Kourtney Greene
 Frankie A. Rodriguez as Carlos Rodriguez
 Joe Serafini as Seb Matthew-Smith
 Mark St. Cyr as Benjamin Mazzara
 Kate Reinders as Miss Jenn

Recurring 
 Alexis Nelis as Natalie Bagley
 Alex Quijano as Mike Bowen
 Derek Hough as Zack
 Olivia Rose Keegan as Lily
 Roman Banks as Howie
 Andrew Barth Feldman as Antoine
 Kimberly Brooks as Michelle Greene

Guest 
 Beth Lacke as Lynne Bowen
 Asher Angel as Jack
 Jordan Fisher as Jamie Porter

Production

Development 
In October 2019, High School Musical: The Musical: The Series was renewed for a second season shortly before the first season debuted on Disney+ the following month. Despite fan speculation that the musical would be an adaptation of the 2006 film High School Musical 2, it was revealed in  February 2020 by showrunner Tim Federle that the musical would not be High School Musical 2, instead it would be the stage adaptation of the 1991 film Beauty and the Beast. On choosing Beauty and the Beast as the musical for the season, Federle explained, “It was one of the first Broadway shows I ever saw, when I was 14, and it’s got all the perfect metaphors for the high school experience: Do people judge me for how I look? What is true love? Will I achieve the future I dream of? And, perhaps most importantly, it’s got dancing forks.”

Casting
The main cast from the first season all returned, with recurring star Joe Serafini being promoted to the main cast in December 2019. On his promotion, Serafini told the Los Angeles Times, "I was screaming. I’m in nine of the 10 episodes in Season 1, so I was hoping that would be the case, but just to hear actually Tim [Federle] call me on the phone and tell me that that was the plan, I was just overjoyed, and I could not be more excited to go back to Salt Lake City to film and be back with the cast." In March 2020, Derek Hough joined the cast as Zack Roy. Later that month, Roman Banks and Olivia Rose Keegan joined the cast as Howie and Lily respectively. A year later, in March 2021, Andrew Barth Feldman and Asher Angel joined the cast as Antoine and Jack respectively. Federle noted about Feldman and Angel, "The cast and I are excited for fans to see how Andrew and Asher expand our East High cinematic universe." Three days before the eleventh episode premiered, Jordan Fisher was confirmed to be appearing in a guest capacity in that episode as Gina's brother Jamie.

For the in-show production of Beauty and the Beast, Ashlyn is cast as Belle, Ricky as the Beast, E.J. as Gaston, Big Red as LeFou, Gina as Babette the Featherduster, Kourtney as Mrs. Potts, Seb as Chip, and Carlos as Lumiere. Nini was originally cast as the Beast's rose, then later in the ensemble. Additionally, in North High's production of Beauty and the Beast, Lily is cast as Belle, Howie as the Beast and Antoine as Lumiere. On casting the characters in the show, Federle stated, "When we have a new season of the show, part of the fun is the casting of the show within the show. I feel like the drama teacher. And some of it is just very basic. Like, I want Dara Reneé to sing ‘Beauty and the Beast,’ so she’s Mrs. Potts. And E.J. sort of is a carbon copy of Gaston. As his arc plays out this season — as he becomes humbled in some places — there’s an interesting juxtaposition of him playing this character who’s such a buffoon." On casting Julia Lester as Belle, he went on to say, "Julia is such a good comedic actor, and such a relatable person, that giving her the opportunity to play Belle was very meaningful to me. Not only does she have a killer voice, but Ashlyn this season is dealing with what it means to be romantically loved for the first time. That makes Ashlyn uncomfortable, because she’s so used to being in the shadows, so to put her in the spotlight in every way felt like a great way to throw that character into some dramatic situations."

Filming
Filming for the second season began in early February 2020, along with the official announcement of the musical and an announcement trailer featuring the cast performing "Beauty and the Beast." However, in March of that year, production was shut down over growing concerns surrounding the COVID-19 pandemic. In the lockdowns, the cast and crew would create a holiday special throughout the fall, which was released on Disney+ in December of that year. When production resumed, strict COVID-19 restrictions would be put in place for the cast and crew. Production resumed later in 2020 and was completed by March 2021.

Music

Pre-orders for the soundtrack began on July 21, 2021. Once again, Joshua Bassett and Olivia Rodrigo write songs for the second season: Bassett wrote "The Perfect Gift" and Rodrigo wrote "The Rose Song." The soundtrack was digitally released on July 30, 2021 on all music streaming services.

Reception

Critical response
The review aggregator website Rotten Tomatoes reported an 75% approval rating based on 8 reviews. Metacritic, which uses a weighted average, assigned a score of 84 out of 100 based on 3 reviews, indicating "generally favorable reviews."

In a four-star review for The Dartmouth, Pierce Wilson noted the lack of character depth and chemistry, and criticized the music for not being as charming as in the first season, but praised the relationship issues, adding, "The fact that none of these relationships were perfect and all had complex issues made the show so much more realistic and immersive...If 'HSMTMTS' is renewed for a third season, I hope it continues to focus on the depth of its characters and refine its sonic identity." Logan Corkins from the Boss Rush Network praised the acting, especially that of Rodrigo, Bassett, Wylie, Lester, Hough and Keegan. He also praised pitting East High against North High for its realism, though "...opening night was one the most anti-climatic parts of the rivalry." He went on to positively review the music, praising Serafini's version of "The Climb" by stating " I particularly love the bridge when the music drops back and you hear Joe let his voice control the song."

Accolades

Notes

References 

2
2021 American television seasons